Gökçe is a village in the Aksaray District, Aksaray Province, Turkey. Its population is 509 (2021).

Places of interest 
 Mamasın Dam
 St. Mamas Church
 St. Michel Church (Aziz Michel Kilisesi)

References

Villages in Aksaray District